Pryce Peacocke was an Anglican priest in Ireland in the 19th Century.

Peacocke was born in Limerick and educated at Trinity College, Dublin. He was  Archdeacon of Limerick from 1861 until 1870.

References

Archdeacons of Limerick
Alumni of Trinity College Dublin
19th-century Irish Anglican priests
Church of Ireland priests